Remix Stories Vol. 2 is an EP released by Unkle. It is the second in a series of unreleased remixes from their albums War Stories and End Titles... Stories for Film. The EP was released on Beatport and vinyl on 6 April 2009, though the vinyl version was limited to 150 copies. The digital version contains all the songs from the vinyl version, as well as 6 additional remixes.

Track listing

Vinyl version
 "Trouble in Paradise (Variation on a Theme)" (Carl Craig C2 Mix) – 10:08
 "Hold My Hand" (Innervisions Orchestra Dub Mix) – 8:17

Digital version
 "Trouble in Paradise (Variation on a Theme)" (Carl Craig C2 Mix) – 10:05
 "Hold My Hand" (Innervisions Orchestra Dub Mix) – 8:17
 "Hold My Hand" (Innervisions Orchestra Instrumental) – 8:19
 "Heaven" (King Unique Remix) – 9:45
 "Heaven" (King Unique Bass Bliss Dub) – 3:47
 "Heaven" (King Unique Acapella) – 3:28
 "Trouble in Paradise (Variation on a Theme)" (Fergie Excentric Mix) – 9:16
 "Keys to the Kingdom" (Lee Coombs Remix) – 5:33

References

Unkle albums
2009 EPs
2009 remix albums
Remix EPs